Calliandra erythrocephala is a species of flowering plants of the genus Calliandra in the family Fabaceae, endemic to southwestern Mexico. It is a small tree with bright red flowers. The species was first scientifically described in 1988.

Distribution
Calliandra erythrocephala is known only from two widely separated localities in Oaxaca and Guerrero, at   elevation.

References

erythrocephala
Flora of Guerrero
Flora of Oaxaca